Washington Township is one of twelve townships in Boone County, Indiana. As of the 2010 census, its population was 1,398 and it contained 547 housing units.

Geography

Unincorporated towns
 Mechanicsburg
 Pike

Adjacent townships
 Center (southeast)
 Clinton (east)
 Jefferson (southwest)
 Sugar Creek (west)
 Jackson Township, Clinton County (north)
 Perry Township, Clinton County (northwest)

Major highways
  Interstate 65
  U.S. Route 52
  Indiana State Road 39
  Indiana State Road 47

Cemeteries
The township contains three cemeteries: Bethel, Bethel Hill and Brush Creek.

References

External links
 United States Census Bureau cartographic boundary files
 U.S. Board on Geographic Names
 Indiana Township Association
 United Township Association of Indiana

Townships in Boone County, Indiana
Townships in Indiana